There are thousands of lakes in the People's Republic of China, including 945 saltwater lakes and 166 salt lakes. Salt lakes and saltwater lakes are listed down there.

The Database of Chinese Lakes provided data on China's salt lakes. Changes in water level, environment, and human activities may increase or decrease the size of each lakes over time.

The Five Largest Salt lakes

Five Largest Saltwater Lakes
The five largest saltwater lakes in China include:

Dried or Divided Salt Lakes

Other Saltwater Lakes

References

See also
List of lakes of China

Lists of lakes of China